The Office of the President is an organ of the Republic of China (Taiwan) that handles the general administrative affairs of the President and the Vice President. The office, together with the National Security Council, serve as the two advisory agencies to the President.

The Office of the President is led by a Secretary-General and oversees 
 Academia Sinica and 
 Academia Historica.

History
The Office of the President was established according to the Constitution of the Republic of China on May 20, 1948 in the Presidential Palace in Nanking, with the inauguration of the first President Chiang Kai-shek and the first Vice President Li Tsung-jen. 

However, with the outbreak of Chinese Civil War, the government of the Republic of China retreated to Taiwan in December 1949. On March 1, 1950, Chiang Kai-shek resumed his presidency in the former office of the Japanese Government-General of Taiwan in Taipei. The building is used as the Presidential Office Building since then.

Organization
 First Bureau
 Second Bureau
 Third Bureau
 Department of Special Affairs
 Department of Security Affairs
 Department of Public Affairs
 Personnel Department
 Department of Accounting and Statistics
 Government Ethics Department
 Legal Affairs Committee
 Academia Sinica
 Academia Historica

Secretaries-General

The Secretary-General to the President is the highest-ranking official in the Office of the President and supervises the staff of the Office. Following the resignation of Su Jia-chyuan on 2 August 2020, Liu Chien-sin took over as acting Secretary-General until 3 August. As of 3 August, David Lee was appointed to the position.

See also
 National Security Council (Taiwan)

References

Government of Taiwan
Presidents of the Republic of China on Taiwan